Saint Bernard is an unincorporated community in Platte County, Nebraska, United States.

History
Saint Bernard was laid out in 1878 on behalf of Bernard Schroeder. It was originally built up chiefly by Germans.

A post office was established at Saint Bernard in 1879, and remained in operation until it was discontinued in 1906.

References

Unincorporated communities in Platte County, Nebraska
Unincorporated communities in Nebraska